Rabbi Akiva Weingarten (born December 23, 1984, in Monsey, New York) is a German-American liberal rabbi. He serves as the rabbi of the city of Dresden, Germany from 2019, and the Liberal Jewish community "Migwan" in Basel, Switzerland. He is the founder of the Haichal Besht synagogue in Bnei Brak, the Haichal Besht synagogue in Berlin, and the Besht Yeshiva in Dresden.

Early life and education 
Weingarten grew up in the Satmar Hasidic community in New Jersey. The eldest of eleven siblings, his mother tongue is Yiddish. His family on his father's side emigrated from post-World War II Hungary, and his maternal ancestors came from Lithuania. He was a "critical thinker" from an early age, and asked questions in the yeshivot, which was met with rejection in his Hasidic community.

He received his first rabbinic ordination at the age of 17. The following year, he went to Israel to continue his studies, and lived in the Haredi city of Bnei Brak for ten years. At the age of 19, he was engaged and married. Two years later, he was already the father of two children. In Israel, he was ordained a rabbi two more times.

In 2014, Weingarten left Israel and the Hasidic community, and went to Germany. He studied Jewish Theology at the University of Potsdam, until he was appointed rabbi to Dresden and Basel in 2019.

Career 
Akiva Weingarten has been rabbi of the "Migwan" Liberal community in Basel and the city of Dresden since August 2019. There, he took over the office of his predecessor Alexander Nachama. Today, Weingarten supports Jews who have left the Haredi communities to get integrated in a life outside of the strictly religious environment. In 2017, he founded the liberal Hasidic community "Besht-Berlin", where Kabbalat Shabbat services, Kiddush, and joint study groups were held regularly. In 2021 he left the "Jüdische Gemeinde zu Dresden" where he served as the Rabbi from 2019 until 2021 and founded a new community "Jüdische Kultusgemeinde Dresden" that has about 200 members, the community's synagogue is the Synagogue Neustadt in Dresden.

Philosophy 
Weingarten is unique as a Liberal rabbi who wears Hasidic clothing such as the shtreimel and kaftan on Shabbat. In his sermons, he often uses Hasidic stories and explanations about the Torah, along with a liberal and up-to-date interpretation. He describes his approach to Judaism as "liberal Hasidic".

References

External links 
 Akiva Weingarten, personal website
 Migwan Basel, Liberal Jewish community of Basel, Switzerland
 JKD Dresden, Jewish community of Dresden, Germany
 Facebook, personal Facebook page
 Youtube, personal Youtube page

1984 births
21st-century German rabbis
American emigrants to Germany
American people of Hungarian-Jewish descent
American people of Lithuanian-Jewish descent
Former Orthodox Jews
German Ashkenazi Jews
German Reform Jews
Living people
People from Bnei Brak
People from New York City
Satmar (Hasidic dynasty)
Swiss Ashkenazi Jews
Swiss rabbis
Swiss Reform Jews